Okeechobee High School is a public high school for grades 9–12 in Okeechobee County, Florida, United States.

The school belongs to the Okeechobee County School District.

Notable alumni
 Gene Harris, former MLB player (Montreal Expos, Seattle Mariners, San Diego Padres, Detroit Tigers, Philadelphia Phillies, Baltimore Orioles)
 Andrew Hooper
 Jimmie Jones, NFL player
 Frankie Neal, NFL player
 Lonnie Pryor, NFL player
 Reggie Rembert, NFL player

See also
 List of high schools in Florida
 Okeechobee High School (1925), original building, still in use as Okeechobee Freshman Campus

References

External links

 
 Great Schools - Okeechobee High School

Public high schools in Florida
Schools in Okeechobee County, Florida